A tree cathedral is an arboretum laid out so the arrangement of the trees creates the typical architectural elements of the nave, chancel, and transepts usually constructed from masonry in a typical medieval cathedral.

Examples of tree cathedrals include:
 Whipsnade Tree Cathedral in Bedfordshire, England.  It was planted from 1932 by the lawyer Edmond Blyth as a First World War memorial, inspired by Liverpool Anglican Cathedral.  It was donated to the National Trust in 1960, and became a Grade II registered garden in 2017.
 The tree cathedral planted 1986 at Newlands, near central Milton Keynes, to a design by the landscape architect Neil Higson, based Norwich Cathedral.

References
 Whipsnade Tree Cathedral, Historic England
 Whipsnade Tree Cathedral, National Trust
 Inside Britain's magnificent Tree Cathedral – and five more arboreal structures , The Telegraph, 5 December 2017
 Tree Cathedral, The Parks Trust, Milton Keynes
 Cattedrale vegetale

Arboreta